The 1974 Tour de France had 13 teams, with 10 cyclists each:

Merckx, who had been absent in 1973 after winning four Tours in a row, was present again. Merckx had not been as dominant in the spring as in other years; it was his first year as a professional cyclist in which he did not win a spring classic. He did win the 1974 Giro d'Italia and the Tour de Suisse, but after winning the latter he required surgery on the perineum, five days before the 1974 Tour started.

Notable absents were Ocaña and Zoetemelk. Zoetemelk was injured during the Midi Libre and was in hospital with life-threatening meningitis. Ocaña had crashed in the Tour de l'Aude, gone home and was fired by his team for not communicating. Bernard Thévenet, who was considered a potential winner, had crashed several times in the 1974 Vuelta a España. He did start in the Tour, but was not yet back at his former level.

Start list

By team

By rider

By nationality

References

1974 Tour de France
1974